"I Zimbra" is a song by American new wave band Talking Heads, released as the second single from their 1979 album Fear of Music.

According to Sytze Steenstra in Song and Circumstance: The Work of David Byrne from Talking Heads to the Present, the music draws heavily on the African popular music Byrne was listening to at the time.

Dada lyrics
The lyrics of "I Zimbra" are an adaptation of Dadaist Hugo Ball's poem Gadji beri bimba.

The lyrics contain these lines:
Gadji beri bimba clandridi
Lauli lonni cadori gadjam
A bim beri glassala glandride
E glassala tuffm I zimbra

Influence
In an interview, Jerry Harrison named "I Zimbra"" as his favorite Talking Heads song, and pointed out that the style of the group's next album, Remain in Light, was indebted to the song's production style.
"We also knew that our next album would be a further exploration of what we had begun with 'I Zimbra'."
 – Jerry Harrison, Liquid Audio, 1997
The song is used in the opening scene of the movie Spider-Man: No Way Home.

Charts

Personnel
Talking Heads
David Byrne – guitars, lead vocals
Jerry Harrison – keyboards, backing vocals, guitars
Tina Weymouth – bass guitar, backing vocals
Chris Frantz – drums

Additional Personnel
Brian Eno – electronic treatments, backing vocals
Robert Fripp – guitar
Gene Wilder – congas 
Ari – congas
Hassam Ramzy – surdo
Abdou M'Boup – djembe, talking drum
Assane Thiam – percussion
Julie Last – backing vocals

Deleted film footage
The song was one of three songs (along with "Cities" and "Big Business") that were cut from the theatrical release of the 1983 concert film Stop Making Sense but were restored as a bonus feature for the 1999 DVD release.

References

1979 songs
Talking Heads songs
Songs written by David Byrne
Songs written by Brian Eno
Sire Records singles
1980 singles
Song recordings produced by Brian Eno
Songs written by Hugo Ball
Gibberish language